Sackcloth and Scarlet is a lost 1925 American silent drama film directed by Henry King and written by Jules Furthman, Thomas J. Geraghty, George Fort Gibbs and Julie Herne. The film stars Alice Terry, Orville Caldwell, Dorothy Sebastian, Otto Matieson, Kathleen Kirkham, and John Miljan. The film was released on March 22, 1925, by Paramount Pictures.

Cast 
Alice Terry as Joan Freeman
Orville Caldwell as Stephen Edwards
Dorothy Sebastian as Polly Freeman
Otto Matieson as Etienne Fochard
Kathleen Kirkham as Beatrice Selignac
John Miljan as Samuel Curtis
Clarissa Selwynne as Miss Curtis
Jack Huff as Jack

References

External links 

 
 

1925 films
1920s English-language films
Silent American drama films
1925 drama films
Paramount Pictures films
Films directed by Henry King
American black-and-white films
American silent feature films
Lost American films
1925 lost films
Lost drama films
1920s American films